First Love is a 1939 American musical film directed by Henry Koster and starring Deanna Durbin. Based on the fairy tale Cinderella, the film is about an orphan who is sent to live with her wealthy aunt and uncle after graduating from boarding school. Her life is made difficult by her snobby cousin who arranges that she stay home while the rest of the family attends a major social ball. With the help of her uncle, she makes it to the ball, where she meets and falls in love with her cousin's boyfriend. The film received Academy Award nominations for Best Art Direction, Best Cinematography, and Best Music.

Plot
Constance Harding is an unhappy orphan who will soon graduate from Miss Wiggins' school for girls. Her only real relatives are members from the James Clinton family, but they show little interest in the teenager. She is brought to New York by one of their butlers, where she moves in with a bunch of snobs. The upperclass people are not impressed with her, but Connie is able to befriend the servants.

One afternoon, her cousin Barbara Clinton orders Connie to stop Ted Drake from going riding without her. Connie tries the best she can, which results in embarrassing herself. She has secretly fallen in love with him and is filled with joy when she learns the Drake family is organizing a ball. The servants raise money to buy her a fashionable dress. However, Barbara spreads a lie and Connie is eventually prohibited from attending the ball.

Connie is heartbroken, until the servants arrange a limousine she can use until midnight. Meanwhile, the police detain the Clinton family car until almost midnight when they can be brought before a judge, since the chauffeur is missing the vehicle's proof of ownership. At the ball, everyone is impressed with her singing talents. Ted notices her and tries to charm her. They eventually kiss, when Connie realizes it is midnight. She runs off, but accidentally leaves one of her slippers behind. Ted finds the slipper and tries to locate the owner.

Arriving at the ball just before midnight, Barbara spots Connie leaving the ball. Infuriated, she tries to break Connie's confidence and fires all the servants. The next day, Connie is missing as well, and her uncle James berates Grace, Barbara, and Walter for their hostile/indifferent attitude to Connie. Meanwhile, Connie returns to Miss Wiggins' school in the hope of becoming a music teacher. Ted follows her and they reunite in the end.

Cast
 Deanna Durbin as Constance (Connie) Harding
 Robert Stack as Ted Drake
 Eugene Pallette as James F. Clinton
 Helen Parrish as Barbara Clinton
 Lewis Howard as Walter Clinton
 Leatrice Joy as Grace Shute Clinton
 June Storey as Wilma van Everett
 Frank Jenks as Mike the Cop
 Kathleen Howard as Miss Wiggins
 Thurston Hall as Anthony Drake
 Marcia Mae Jones as Marcia Parker
 Samuel S. Hinds as Mr. Parker
 Doris Lloyd as Mrs. Parker
 Charles Coleman as George, Clinton's Butler
 Jack Mulhall as Terry
 Mary Treen as Agnes, Barbara's Maid
 Dorothy Vaughan as Ollie, Mrs. Clinton's Maid
 Lucille Ward as Clinton's Cook
 Larry Steers as Ball Guest (uncredited) 
 Eric Wilton as Drake's Butler (uncredited)

Production
In April 1938, Universal announced Durbin would star in Cinderella directed by Henry Koster and producer by Joe Pasternak from a script by Bruce Manning and Felix Jackson, in color.
In May the studio said Durbin would make the film following Three Smart Girls Grow Up. However in late May it was reported the film was abandoned due to protests by exhibitors and also the objections of Walt Disney who said he owned the title.

In June 1938, Peter Milne and Irma Von Curbe were reported writing the script, now called First Love.

In January 1939, Charles Boyer signed to co star.

The film was pushed back to Durbin could make After School Days.

Eventually Boyer dropped out of the film. Lewis Howard and Robert Stack were signed to make their debuts. Filming started June 1939. The movie was shot in black and white.

Filming started with writer Bruce Manning saying he was unsure of the ending.

Joe Pasternak later wrote in his memoirs there had been pressure at Universal to put Durbin in older roles:
I insisted that Deanna was one of those personalities which the world not only takes  to its bosom but insists as regarding as its personal prop-erty. We dressed her, as I said, with great consideration for her position. The occasion of her first kiss was as significant to us, and, as it happened, to her audience, as must be the first kiss of any girl sixteen years old. We instituted a veritable Gone With the Wind-style search for the right boy. Robert Stack finally won it. A million words must have been written on the subject. I do not contend that there were not more weighty matters at the 
time. But it is proof, I think, of the interest that every stage of Deanna's development held for the world.

Reception
In his review in The New York Times, Frank S. Nugent wrote that the film "affords the usual pleasant scope for the talents, graces and charming accomplishments of Miss Deanna Durbin." Nugent continued:

The film is recognized by American Film Institute in these lists:
 2002: AFI's 100 Years...100 Passions – Nominated

References

External links

First Love (1939) at the Toronto Film Society

1939 films
Films directed by Henry Koster
1930s English-language films
American black-and-white films
Universal Pictures films
1939 musical films
Films about orphans
Films based on Charles Perrault's Cinderella
Films set in New York City
Films produced by Joe Pasternak
American musical films
Films scored by Hans J. Salter
1930s American films
English-language musical films